Iva Majoli was the defending champion but lost in the second round to Patty Schnyder.

Schnyder won in the final 6–0, 2–6, 7–5 against Jana Novotná.

Seeds
A champion seed is indicated in bold text while text in italics indicates the round in which that seed was eliminated. The top four seeds received a bye to the second round.

  Jana Novotná (final)
  Steffi Graf (quarterfinals)
  Iva Majoli (second round)
 n/a
  Irina Spîrlea (first round)
  Anke Huber (quarterfinals)
  Nathalie Tauziat (quarterfinals)
  Lisa Raymond (quarterfinals)

Draw

Final

Section 1

Section 2

External links
 1998 Faber Grand Prix Draw

Faber Grand Prix
1998 WTA Tour